is a former general manager of the Yokohama DeNA BayStars, and former manager of the Hokkaido Nippon-Ham Fighters and the Tokyo Yakult Swallows in Japan's Nippon Professional Baseball. He was previously an outfielder for the Yomiuri Giants and won the 1968 Central League Rookie of the Year award.

References

External links
 

1945 births
Living people
Baseball people from Osaka
Meiji University alumni
Japanese baseball players
Yomiuri Giants players
Nippon Professional Baseball Rookie of the Year Award winners
Managers of baseball teams in Japan
Hokkaido Nippon-Ham Fighters managers
Tokyo Yakult Swallows managers
Yokohama DeNA BayStars